Chanticleer is an unincorporated community in Chicot County, Arkansas, United States. It is located at the junction of U.S. Routes 65 and 82, and Arkansas Highway 159 at the southern border of Lake Village.

References

Unincorporated communities in Chicot County, Arkansas
Unincorporated communities in Arkansas